The Rwanda Basketball League (RBL) (formerly the National Basketball League Rwanda) is the top professional basketball league in Rwanda. Its season usually runs from November to September. The winners of the NBL season qualify for the qualifiers for the Basketball Africa League (BAL).

The league currently consists of 14 teams, most of them being from the country's capital Kigali. The current champion of the NBL are REG, having won the 2022 title. REG and their rival Patriots BBC have dominated the league, winning all titles since 2015.

Since the 2021–22 season, the FERWABA also organises the Rwanda Basketball League Division 2 to which the bottom two teams of the RBL relegate.

History 
Basketball was introduced in Rwanda in 1930 by Catholic priests, who first thought the sport at high schools in the Southern Province. The following decades, the presence of the sport increased as the military and some public institutions created basketball teams. In 1974, the national basketball federation FERWABA was established. Three years later, in 1977, the first national league was created. 

The 1994 Rwandan genocide threw the sport back, because Tutsi players, spectators and administrators died and crucial infrastructure was destroyed.

In the 2000s, APR was the dominant team in Rwanda and it participated in the FIBA Africa Clubs Champions Cup thrice. Its best result was a bronze medal in 2009.

From 2011 to 2015, Espoir BBC won four straight national titles. From then, two newly established teams REG (owned by  the Rwanda Energy Group) and Patriots entered the league. The two teams became rivals and played each other in the finals for several years.

In the 2020s, the Basketball Africa League (BAL) was introduced – the first editions were hosted by the BK Arena in Kigali. Patriots finished in fourth place in the inaugural 2021 season.

Current teams 
The following teams will play in the 2022–23 season:

Sources:

Champions

Performance by club

Individual awards

Most Valuable Player 

 2012:  Aristide Mugabe (Espoir)
 2013:  Bienvenu Ngandu

 2014:  Mike Buzangu (Cercle Sportif de Kigali)

2017–18:  Sedar Sagamba (Patriots)
2018–19:  Dieudonné Ndizeye (Patriots)
2020–21:  Olivier Shyaka (REG)
2021–22:  Axel Mpoyo (REG)

Team of the Year

In African competitions
Each year, the champions of the NBL were placed for the qualifiers of the FIBA Africa Basketball League, the premiere pan-African competition. Since 2020, this league is replaced by the Basketball Africa League (BAL). The following list shows Rwandan teams which played in a main tournament:

In the Basketball Africa League

See also 
 Rwandan Heroes Cup
 FERWABA

Notes

References

External links 
 Rwanda at AfroBasket.com

Basketball competitions in Rwanda
Basketball leagues in Africa
Sports leagues established in 1977
1977 establishments in Rwanda